Crem Helado is a Colombian ice-cream company, owned by Grupo Nutresa.

The company, in 2018, had an income of 118.4 million dollars, having control of 41.4% of ice-cream market that year.

History 
Company was founded in 1955 by Horace Day, an American businessman based in Colombia, who created an ice cream store in Bogotá, more specifically, on Caracas Avenue with Calle 32
called "Helados Chikos" that ended in failure.

In 1964, Tropicrem Ltda. was founded, the company that started industrial ice cream production in Colombia.
Tropricrem Ltda. was bought in 1982 by Meals S. A, food company.

In 2003, Meals S. A. announced its participation in Helados Melca in Panama. Helados Melca was a union between some Panamanian businessmen & Nestlé's ice cream division, however, this trademark failed after a while, so Meals decide to leave this market.

In 2006, Meals was bought by Grupo Nutresa.

Additional products 
In 1992, Meals announces an orange juice trademark called Country Hill.

Critics 
Crem Helado has been criticized because the company has labour policies with its hawkers (specifically, some sole trader policies) that make impossible to try to access pensions, unemployment benefits, labour rights, or fixed salary. Additionally, the company workers schedule is out of any labour policy.

This makes somebody sale company products in not appropriate places to that, like public transport.

During COVID-19 pandemic, marked by the low demand, his conditions were news because some sellers despaired.

A lot of protests by Colombian Union of Food Industry Workers claim the finishing of this laboural politics.

References 

Ice cream brands
1955 establishments in Colombia
Dairy products companies of Colombia
Companies based in Bogotá